Dr. Laxminarayan Sahu (3 October 1890 – 18 January 1963) was an eminent and noted writer, poet, journalist, social worker, reformer, historian, politician from Odisha, India.

He was born in a village named Manikhamba near Balasore and was the only son of his father, Khetramohan Sahu and got degrees of M.A. and L.L.B. after graduation from school. He was a teacher of repute. He was noted for his writings and books recording the tribal myths of Odisha. His stories were connected with creation, heaven, and hell, life and death, which the tribal people of Odisha have been taken down from the lips to lips from generations.  He was also deeply involved in promotion and preservation of folk dance and music of Odisha and Odia culture, language and literature. Apart from Odia he was also for his writings in Hindi, Bengali, English and Sanskrit. His other famous stories are "Veena", "Sulata", "Control Room", poems " Pashara " and social story of "Springs of the Soul " etc. He was also editor of the Odia newspaper Sahakaara and English dailies - Vatarini and Star of Utkal As a reformer, he fought against untouchability and social evils against women.

He was elected to Odisha Assembly in 1947 and was a member of Constituent Assembly of India. He was noted for his fiery and to the fact debates while drafting of constitution of India and even Dr. B. R. Ambedkar had to admit in context of arguments put forth by Laxminarayan Sahu that the Constitution was carrying contradictions, harmful enough to shatter India, unless removed by the people's representatives in the earliest opportunity. At the debate in Constituent Assembly of India, he is said to have thundered:- Mr. Kamath has quietly introduced in it the God too. Some people hold that there is no God. The people of India do not want God.

He was awarded Padma Shri in year 1955 for his contributions in field of Literature & Education. He was also given title of Ithihasaratna for his works and writings on history of Odisha. He was a member of Asiatic Society, President of Odisha Sahitya Academy and also a member of Servants of India Society.

A school in Cuttack has been named after him as Lakshmi Narayan Sahu Mahavidyalaya.

References 

1890 births
1963 deaths
Social workers from Odisha
Members of the Constituent Assembly of India
Activists from Odisha
20th-century Indian educational theorists
Odia-language writers
English-language writers from India
Hindi-language writers
Indian male journalists
People from Balasore district
Social workers
20th-century Indian poets
20th-century Indian historians
Recipients of the Padma Shri in literature & education
Scientists from Odisha
20th-century Indian male writers
Poets from Odisha